Lincoln Detox was a drug detoxification clinic in Lincoln Hospital. It was founded in 1970 in the South Bronx by the Black Panther Party, the Republic of New Afrika, the Young Lords, and Students for a Democratic Society.  The clinic offered holistic drug rehabilitation, employing acupuncture, Marxist education classes and community service.

In the courses, participants learned about their addiction in a communist context, exploring how their addiction harmed themselves, their family and their community. Administrators believed that drug addiction was "a scheme concocted by a white government to oppress blacks" and that revolutionary communism was the best cure. The clinic received about a million dollars in state and local funding.

Lincoln Detox cost the county four times more per patient than comparable New York City clinics, but treated only half as many patients. It also utilized excess medical supplies by supporting further community health efforts through the Black Liberation Army. Acupuncture was introduced by Richard Taft, a graduate of Baylor College of Medicine, in 1974. Mutulu Shakur worked at the clinic for years before being forced underground and becoming an FBI Ten Most Wanted Fugitive. In 1976, NYC's Health and Hospitals Corporation discovered one million dollars in unsubstantiated payroll. An auditor's visit found that only 50% of staff on duty were actually present and a doctor overdosed and died inside the clinic, although clinic personnel suspect he was murdered by the CIA.

The clinic was finally shut down by Ed Koch and Lincoln Hospital on November 27, 1978.

Sources
 Churchill, Ward Vander Wall. The COINTELPRO Papers: documents from the FBI's secret wars against dissent.  2002. p. 309.

References

Far-left politics in the United States
Health activism
Mott Haven, Bronx
Healthcare in New York City
NYC Health + Hospitals
Clinics in New York City